The XIX (2nd Royal Saxon) Army Corps / XIX AK was a Saxon corps level command of the German Army, before and during World War I.

As the German Army expanded in the latter part of the 19th century and early part of the 20th century, the XIX Army Corps was set up on 1 April 1899 in Leipzig as the Generalkommando (headquarters) for the western part of the Kingdom of Saxony (districts of Leipzig, Chemnitz and Zwickau).  It took over command of 24th (2nd Royal Saxon) Division from XII (1st Royal Saxon) Corps and the newly formed 40th (4th Royal Saxon) Division.

It was assigned to the II Army Inspectorate which formed the predominantly Saxon 3rd Army at the start of the First World War.  It was still in existence at the end of the war in the 19th Army, Heeresgruppe Herzog Albrecht von Württemberg on the Western Front.

Peacetime organisation 
The 25 peacetime Corps of the German Army (Guards, I - XXI, I - III Bavarian) had a reasonably standardised organisation.  Each consisted of two divisions with usually two infantry brigades, one field artillery brigade and a cavalry brigade each.  Each brigade normally consisted of two regiments of the appropriate type, so each Corps normally commanded 8 infantry, 4 field artillery and 4 cavalry regiments.  There were exceptions to this rule:
V, VI, VII, IX and XIV Corps each had a 5th infantry brigade (so 10 infantry regiments)
II, XIII, XVIII and XXI Corps had a 9th infantry regiment
I, VI and XVI Corps had a 3rd cavalry brigade (so 6 cavalry regiments)
the Guards Corps had 11 infantry regiments (in 5 brigades) and 8 cavalry regiments (in 4 brigades).
Each Corps also directly controlled a number of other units.  This could include one or more
Foot Artillery Regiment
Jäger Battalion
Pioneer Battalion
Train Battalion

World War I

Organisation on mobilisation 
On mobilization on 2 August 1914 the Corps was restructured.  40th Cavalry Brigade was withdrawn to form part of the 8th Cavalry Division and the 24th Cavalry Brigade was broken up and its regiments assigned to the divisions as reconnaissance units.  Divisions received engineer companies and other support units from the Corps headquarters.  In summary, XIX Corps mobilised with 25 infantry battalions, 9 machine gun companies (54 machine guns), 8 cavalry squadrons, 24 field artillery batteries (144 guns), 4 heavy artillery batteries (16 guns), 3 pioneer companies and an aviation detachment.

Combat chronicle 
On mobilisation, XIX Corps was assigned to the predominantly Saxon 3rd Army forming part of the right wing of the forces for the Schlieffen Plan offensive in August 1914 on the Western Front.  It spent the entire war on the Western Front.  It was still in existence at the end of the war in the 19th Army, Heeresgruppe Herzog Albrecht von Württemberg.

Commanders 
The XIX Corps had the following commanders during its existence:

See also 

German Army order of battle (1914)
German Army order of battle, Western Front (1918)
List of Imperial German infantry regiments
List of Imperial German artillery regiments
List of Imperial German cavalry regiments
Royal Saxon Army

Notes

References 
 XIX. Armeekorps (Chronik 1914/1918)
 Claus von Bredow, bearb., Historische Rang- und Stammliste des deutschen Heeres (1905)
 Günter Wegner, Stellenbesetzung der deutschen Heere 1815-1939. (Biblio Verlag, Osnabrück, 1993), Bd. 1

Further reading 
 
 
 
 
 

Corps of Germany in World War I
Military units and formations established in 1899
Military units and formations disestablished in 1919